The 1974–75 Atlanta Flames season was the third season for the franchise.

Regular season

Final standings

Schedule and results

Player statistics

Skaters
Note: GP = Games played; G = Goals; A = Assists; Pts = Points; PIM = Penalty minutes

†Denotes player spent time with another team before joining Atlanta.  Stats reflect time with the Flames only.
‡Traded mid-season

Goaltending
Note: GP = Games played; TOI = Time on ice (minutes); W = Wins; L = Losses; OT = Overtime/shootout losses; GA = Goals against; SO = Shutouts; GAA = Goals against average

Transactions
The Flames were involved in the following transactions during the 1974–75 season.

Trades

Free agents

Expansion Draft

Draft picks

References
 Flames on Hockey Database

Atlanta
Atlanta
Atlanta Flames seasons